Kumir is a Tajik film released in 1988. It was directed by Yormahmad Aralev and stars Daler Nazarov, Larisa Belogurova and Ahmadsho Ulfatshoyev.

Synopsis 

Khurshed (Daler Nazarov), a pop singer, works under the leadership of impresario Mir Alisovich. Soon he achieves success and a hero does not notice that he is gradually caught in a circle involving his new boss and patron.

The film was shot in Dushanbe studio.

Cast 
Daler Nazarov (Khurshed)
Larisa Belogurova
Ahmadsho Ulfatshoyev
Yunus Yusupov
Yelena Seropova

Crew 

 Director: Yormahmad Aralev
 Story: Muhib Qurbon
 Music: Daler Nazarov and Muboraksho Mirzoshoyev

External links 
 
1988 films